The Discoverer is a 1999 novel by Norwegian author Jan Kjærstad. It won the Nordic Council's Literature Prize in 2001.

References

1999 novels
20th-century Norwegian novels
Norwegian-language novels
Nordic Council's Literature Prize-winning works